Bealtaine (also called Beltane) is an ancient Gaelic holiday.

Beltaine may also refer to:
Beltaine (band), a Polish folk band
Beltaine (album), an album by Inkubus Sukkubus
"Beltaine" (song)